Ra Un-sim (born 2 July 1988), Hero of Labor, is a North Korean female international football player.

She plays club football with April 25 of the Korea DPR Women's League. In January 2016, she was named number one of the DPRK's ten best athletes of 2015. In the 2017 edition of the women's Paektusan Prize tournament she was the top goalscorer with 8 goals.

International goals

Under 19

National team

Honours 
North Korea
Winner
 EAFF Women's East Asian Cup: 2015

Runners-up
 AFC Women's Asian Cup: 2010

References

External links 
 

1988 births
Living people
North Korean women's footballers
Women's association football forwards
Asian Games medalists in football
Footballers at the 2010 Asian Games
Footballers at the 2014 Asian Games
North Korea women's international footballers
Asian Games gold medalists for North Korea
Asian Games silver medalists for North Korea
Medalists at the 2010 Asian Games
Medalists at the 2014 Asian Games
2011 FIFA Women's World Cup players